Mughan Ganjali is a village and municipality in the Sabirabad District of Azerbaijan. It has a population of 1,713. The village was renamed in honor of the dynasties coming from Ganja city of Azerbaijan in the 16th and 17th centuries.

References 

Populated places in Sabirabad District